Martineau is a surname. It is of French origin and may refer to:

 Alice Martineau (1972–2003), English pop singer and songwriter
 Alfred Albert Martineau (1859–1945), French Governor General
 Alfred Martineau (cricketer) (1868–1940), English cricketer
 André Martineau (1930–1972), French mathematician 
 Barrett Martineau (born 1991), Canadian skeleton racer 
 Don Martineau (1952–2006), American ice hockey player
 Earl Martineau (1896–1966), American football player and coach
 Emmanuel Martineau (born 1946), French philosopher
 Eugène Martineau (politician) (1837–1880), Ottawa mayor
 Eugène Martineau (athlete) (born in 1980), a decathlete from the Netherlands
 France Martineau, Canadian linguist and professor
 François Martineau (1844–1911), Canadian politician
 G. D. Martineau (1897–1976), English cricket writer
 George Martineau (1905–1969), Dean of Edinburgh
 Gérald Martineau (1902–1968), Canadian politician
 Géraldine Martineau (born 1985), French actress
 Gilbert Martineau (1918–1995), French author and Honorary Consul on St Helena
 Gord Martineau (born 1948), Canadian television journalist
 Harriet Martineau (1802-1876), British social theorist and Whig writer, often cited as the first female sociologist.
 Henri Martineau (1882–1958), French journalist
 Herbert Martineau (1914-1994), British racewalker
 Horace Martineau (1874–1916), South African recipient of the Victoria Cross
 Hubert Martineau (1891–1976), English patron of cricket
 Jacques Martineau (born 1963), French film director
 Jane Martineau, British art historian
 Jean Martineau (lawyer) (1895–1985), Canadian lawyer and President of the Canada Council for the Arts
 Jean Martineau (ice hockey)  (born 1961), Canadian ice hockey executive
 Jérôme Martineau (1750–1809), Canadian businessman and politician
 Jesse Martineau, American politician

 John Ellis Martineau (1873–1937), Governor of Arkansas, U.S. District Judge for the Eastern District of Arkansas
 Lionel Martineau (1867–1906), English cricketer
 Louis-Simon Martineau (1733–1799), French politician
 Luc Martineau, Canadian judge
 Malcolm Martineau (born 1960), Scottish pianist
 Mike Martineau (1959–2012), American television writer and stand-up comedian
 Paul Martineau (born 1921), Canadian politician, lawyer and crown attorney
 
 Sir Philip Martineau (1862–1944), English cricketer and lawyer
 Pierre Raymond Martineau (born 1935), Canadian businessman  and politician
 Pierre-Raymond-Léonard Martineau (1857–1903), Canadian lawyer and politician
 Richard Martineau (born 1961), Canadian journalist
 Robert Martineau (1913–1999), Bishop of Huntingdon and Blackburn
 Robert Braithwaite Martineau (1826–1869), English painter
 Shereen Martineau, Irish actress
 Sydney Martineau (1863–1945), British fencer
 Martineau family, a dynasty originating in Norwich, England, including prominent politicians and Unitarians
 Edith Martineau (1842–1909), British watercolour painter
 Harriet Martineau (1802–1876), writer and pioneer sociologist
 James Martineau (1805–1900), philosopher
 John Martineau (1789–1832), English sugar refiner and engineer
 Peter Finch Martineau (1755–1847), English businessman and community benefactor

See also
 R. v. Martineau (1990), leading Supreme Court of Canada case on the mens rea requirement for murder
 Martineau Galleries, a proposed mixed-use development for Birmingham, England
 Martineau Gardens, a community garden in Birmingham, England
 Martineau Place, a shopping centre in Birmingham, England

Surnames from given names